The Association of Serbo-Macedonians ( / Društvo Srbo-Makedonci) was a group founded by intellectuals from the region of Macedonia in 1886, and based in Istanbul, Ottoman Empire. The association propagated a kind of pro-Serbian  Slav Macedonian identity, distinguished especially from the ethnic identity of the Bulgarians.

Background 

Macedonian nationalism asserts a distinct Macedonian identity, and first emerged as a thin intellectual movement in the 1860s. However, until the early 20th century, Macedonian Slavs identified with the national church of their local priest as either "Bulgarian," "Serbian" or "Greek". The Bulgarian self-identitification was most prevalent then, and perceivable pro-Bulgarian sentiments endured up until the end of the Second World War. The Serbs and Bulgarians had already established their own nation-states and intellectuals from the region of Macedonia often sought their ideological support.

The Association of Serbo-Macedonians looked to Serbia for support in petitioning the Ottoman Empire in favor of its political aspirations. Its founders had all formerly been members of the Secret Macedonian Committee. This Committee was founded by  Slav Macedonian expatriate students in 1885 in Sofia, Bulgaria, but it was quickly uncovered by the Bulgarian authorities and disbanded. Four of its members left Bulgaria, and went to Belgrade, Serbia. Meanwhile, the first "Gathering of Serbo-Macedonians and Old Serbs" was held in Belgrade on February 23, 1885. At that time the development of pro-Serbian Macedonian identity was directly encouraged by Belgrade as a stage to its final turning into Old Serbian.

Establishment and activities 

In Belgrade, the group's members met with the Serbian politician Stojan Novaković who pledged his support. Novaković proposed to spread Serbophilia so as to counteract the strong Bulgarian influence in Macedonia. The decision to create the association in Istanbul was taken at a meeting of the Serbian government in early August 1886. At the same meeting was taken also a decision to create the Saint Sava society, both for dissemination of the Serbian propaganda in the region of Macedonia. Novakovic's diplomatic activity in Istanbul played a significant role for the realization of this idea, especially through the establishment of the Association of Serbo-Macedonians. He was sent as the Serbian envoy in the capital of the Ottoman Empire, considered as one of the most important posts in that period. Shortly afterwards Novaković took up his appointment, where he met with two members of the Macedonian committee to initiate the plan: K. Grupchev and N. Evrov. Although this was only partially successful, Serbian schools were opened in the region of Macedonia, and books were printed in the Macedonian dialect with strong Serbian linguistic influence. Despite the fact, initially this schools attempted to develop a middle road between Serbian and Macedonian dialects. In 1889 when asked to the reprinting of these texts in the Macedonian dialect, Novaković recommended only the Serbian language should be used. He claimed, the anticipated attraction of the Macedonian dialect had not eventuated. In accordance with Novaković's  plans the "Macedonism" was seen as a stage of the gradual Serbianisation of the Macedonian Slavs. As result, on the eve of the new century, he and his collaborators promoted already only pro-Serbian ideas.

Program 
The political aspirations of the Association closely mirrored those of its predecessor, and their program can be summarized in the following points:
 that the interests of the Ottoman Empire be protected;
 that a newspaper (Macedonian Voice) be printed in Istanbul in the "pure Macedonian language";
 that the Macedonian Slavs abandon the Bulgarian Exarchate;
 that the Archbishopric of Ohrid be restored (under the jurisdiction of the Ecumenical Patriarchate);
 that the Bulgarian influence in Macedonia be countered with Serbophilia;
 that the Bulgarian bishops and teachers be expelled from Macedonia;
 that schools be opened where teachers will use the local Macedonian vernacular.
 and that Bulgarian linguistic influence be replaced with a Serbian one.

References

See also
Macedonism
Serbomans
Macedonian Bulgarians

History of North Macedonia
Serbian irredentism
Anti-Bulgarian sentiment
19th century in Serbia
Macedonia under the Ottoman Empire
Organizations established in 1886
Serbs of North Macedonia
Serbs from the Ottoman Empire
Serb organizations
Serbian nationalism in North Macedonia